The swimming competition at the 1967 Summer Universiade took place in Tokyo, Japan in August 1967.

Men's events

Legend:

Women's events

Legend:

References
Medalist Summary (Men) on GBRATHLETICS.com
Medalist Summary (Women) on GBRATHLETICS.com

1967 in swimming
Swimming at the Summer Universiade
1967 Summer Universiade